The Men's Freestyle 74 kg was a competition featured at the 2022 European Wrestling Championships, and was held in Budapest, Hungary  on March 29 and 30.

Medalists

Results 
 Legend
 F — Won by fall
 R — Retired
 WO — Won by walkover

Final

Top half

Bottom half

Repechage

Final standing

References

External links
Draw

Men's freestyle 74 kg